Voice-based marketing automation (VBMA) refers to software platforms designed for marketing, sales, and support departments to measure, manage, and automate their phone conversations. Marketing departments, sales teams, and support agents use VBMA to initiate, manage, monitor, track, route, record, and report on sales and support phone conversations.

VBMA encompasses a wide range of automation and analytics tools. It is used as a standalone solution and as a way to complement the functionality found in traditional marketing automation software.

Comparison to marketing automation

Growth of voice-based marketing automation
Voice-based marketing automation platforms have emerged as an integrated solution in response to both the growth in mobile users, and mobile advertising. It is estimated that mobile search will generate 73 billion calls to businesses (up from 30 billion in 2013) and businesses are placing more value on phone calls as a lead source, as is evident from the estimated $64.6 billion spent annually on ads to generate phone calls. With Google's call-only ad type, businesses were able to general billions of calls through mobile search. In 2015, mobile search drove 48 percent of calls. Advances in call analytics have been made to provide businesses deeper insights to measure and optimize inbound calls.

Functionality
Voice-based marketing automation software consists of the following core pieces of functionality:
Call tracking Enables marketers to tie incoming phone calls back to the specific marketing source (ad, keyword search, email, QR code, website, collateral, trade show, or other source) that originated it.
Hosted IVR (interactive voice response) Is a cloud-based technology that allows a computer to interact with humans through the use of voice and DTMF tones input via keypad. Inbound IVRs are used as auto-attendants to answer, qualify, and route callers to their desired area of the organization. They can also be used to process orders or provide basic information without involving a live operator. Outbound IVRs are also used in voice broadcast campaigns to conduct customer surveys, solicit and process orders, and more.
Voice broadcasting Is a mass communication technique that broadcasts telephone messages to hundreds or thousands of call recipients at once. They are a means of automating appointment reminders, delivery confirmations, event promotions, reorders, accounts receivable collections, phone surveys, and more. Voice broadcasts delivered via voice-based marketing automation can be an audio recording, a text-to-speech message, or an IVR for handling recipient interaction. The system can also play different messages if a live person answers or if the call goes to voicemail.
Call routing and forwarding Automatically passes inbound phone calls to a specific location, department, agent, or group of agents based on various criteria.
Call screening Gives agents the option of accepting or declining calls based on a caller’s information.
Call transcription Captures voice interactions by transcribing conversations, IVR responses, and voice messages.
Call recording Automatically captures calls or portions of calls as audio files.
Agent panels Appear on sales and support agents computer screens and display information on incoming calls, such as their names, phone numbers, the marketing source they are calling from, and CRM information.
Manager dashboards Appear on the sales or support team manager’s computer screen and enable them to monitor agent activities.
Web form call triggering Initiates a call to a company’s agent when a visitor on their website submits their phone number in a web form. If the agent accepts the call, the system calls the web site visitor and connects the two in conversation.
SMS messaging Is a service where business can send text messages to their use base to generate and nurture leads, confirm appointments and deliveries, provide alerts, and other functions.
API integration Is a protocol intended to be used as an interface by software components to communicate with each other.
Software analytics Enabled software practitioners to perform data exploration and analysis to obtain insightful and actionable information for completing various tasks.

How voice-based marketing automation is used
There are three types of groups who use voice-based marketing automation software:
Marketers Use voice-based marketing automation to generate, track, qualify, filter, route, and report on inbound sales calls. They also use the call recording component to review sales and support calls.
Salespeople Use voice-based marketing automation to capture and respond to phone leads. They often set up a virtual call center to manage, route, and record inbound sales calls. Sales teams also use the voice broadcasting and SMS messaging components to automate the communication of information and to process orders.
Support professionals Use voice-based marketing automation to provide phone-based customer service using a virtual call center to handle support calls. The software enables agents to work from any location and receive and transfer calls using any phone type. Support teams often use the IVR technology component to answer incoming calls, provide answers to routine inquiries, conduct surveys, and route callers who need to speak to a live person to the correct agent or group of agents.

See also
Demand generation
Lead scoring
Call tracking
Voice broadcasting
 Interactive voice response (IVR)
SMS

References

Marketing software
Sales